Emanuela Zardo was the defending champion, but lost in the final to Julie Halard. The score was 6–0, 7–5.

Seeds

Draw

Finals

Top half

Bottom half

References

External links
 Official results archive (ITF)
 Official results archive (WTA)

Ilva Trophy
1992 WTA Tour